Euhaplomyces is a genus of fungi in the family Laboulbeniaceae. A monotypic genus, Euhaplomyces contains the single species Euhaplomyces ancyrophori.

References

External links
Euhaplomyces at Index Fungorum

Laboulbeniomycetes
Monotypic Laboulbeniomycetes genera